is a Japanese former Nippon Professional Baseball pitcher.

References 

1973 births
Living people
Baseball people from Osaka Prefecture 
Japanese baseball players
Nippon Professional Baseball pitchers
Fukuoka Daiei Hawks players
Fukuoka SoftBank Hawks players
Managers of baseball teams in Japan